Bassarona piratica is a species of butterfly in the family Nymphalidae. It is endemic to the Philippines.

Taxonomy
B. piratica has the following subspecies:
B. piratica spp. medaga (Fruhstorfer, 1913)
B. piratica spp. piratica
B. piratica spp. sarmana (Fruhstorfer, 1913)

References

Butterflies described in 1888
Insects of the Philippines
piratica